In game theory a Poisson game is a game with a random number of players, where the distribution of the number of players follows a Poisson random process. An extension of games of imperfect information, Poisson games have mostly seen application to models of voting.

A Poisson games consists of a random population of possible players of various types. Every player in the game has some probability of being of some type. The type of the player affects their payoffs in the game. Each type chooses an action and payoffs are determined.

Example

Formal definitions 
Large Poisson game - the collection , where:
 - the average number of players in the game
 - the set of all possible types for a player, (same for each player).
 - the probability distribution over  according to which the types are selected.
 - the set of all possible pure choices, (same for each player, same for each type).
 - the payoff (utility) function.

The total number of players,  is a poisson distributed random variable: 

Strategy -

Nash equilibrium -

Simple probabilistic properties 
Environmental equivalence - from the perspective of each player the number of other players is a Poisson random variable with mean .

Decomposition property for types - the number of players of the type  is a Poisson random variable with mean .

Decomposition property for choices - the number of players who have chosen the choice  is a Poisson random variable with mean 

Pivotal probability ordering
Every limit of the form  is equal to 0 or to infinity.
This means that all pivotal probability may be ordered from the most important to the least important.

Magnitude
. This has a nice form: twice geometric mean minus arithmetic mean.

Existence of equilibrium 
Theorem 1. Nash equilibrium exists.

Theorem 2. Nash equilibrium in undominated strategies exists.

Applications 
Mainly large poisson games are used as models for voting procedures.

See also
Poisson distribution

References 

 
 
 

Game theory game classes